In the 2000–01 season, USM Alger is competing in the Super Division for the 21st time, as well as the Algerian Cup.  It is their 6th consecutive season in the top flight of Algerian football. They will be competing in Ligue 1 and the Algerian Cup.

Squad list
Players and squad numbers last updated on 1 September 2001.Note: Flags indicate national team as has been defined under FIFA eligibility rules. Players may hold more than one non-FIFA nationality.

Competitions

Overview

Super Division

League table

Results summary

Results by round

Matches

Algerian Cup

Squad information

Appearances and goals

|-

Goalscorers
Includes all competitive matches. The list is sorted alphabetically by surname when total goals are equal.

Clean sheets
Includes all competitive matches.

Hat-tricks

(H) – Home ; (A) – Away

Transfers

In

Out

Notes

References

USM Alger seasons
USM Alger